Chuckie Egg is a video game released by A&F Software in 1983 initially for the ZX Spectrum, BBC Micro, and Dragon 32/64. It was ported to the Commodore 64, Acorn Electron, MSX, Tatung Einstein, Amstrad CPC, and Atari 8-bit family. It was later updated for the Amiga, Atari ST, and IBM PC compatibles.

The game was written by Nigel Alderton, then 16 or 17 years old. After a month or two of development, Nigel took a pre-release version of his Spectrum code to the two-year-old software company A&F, co-founded by Doug Anderson and Mike Fitzgerald (the "A" and "F", respectively). Doug took on the simultaneous development of the BBC Micro version, whilst Mike Webb, an A&F employee, completed the Dragon port. 

The versions fall broadly into two groups: those with realistic physics (e.g., BBC Micro and Amstrad CPC) and those without (e.g., ZX Spectrum). Although there is a substantial difference in play between the two, levels remain largely the same and all the 8-bit versions have been cited as classics.

Gameplay

As Hen-House Harry, the player must collect the twelve eggs positioned in each level, before a countdown timer reaches zero. In addition there are piles of seed which may be collected to increase points and stop the countdown timer for a while, but will otherwise be eaten by hens that patrol the level, causing them to pause. If the player touches a hen or falls through a gap in the bottom of the level, they lose a life. Each level is made of solid platforms, ladders, and occasionally lift platforms that move upwards and when they reach the top of the screen wrap around to the bottom. Hitting the top of the screen while on one of these lifts, however, will also cause the player to lose a life.

Eight levels are defined and are played initially under the watch of a giant caged duck. Upon completion of all eight the levels are played again without hens, but Harry is now pursued by the freed duck flying around the screen and homing in on him. A second completion of all eight levels yields a third play through with both hens and the duck. A fourth pass introduces additional hens.  Finally, a fifth pass has the duck and additional hens moving at a greater speed.  If the player completes all forty levels then they advance to 'level 41' which is in fact exactly the same as level 33. 

The player starts with five lives, and an extra life is awarded every 10,000 points.

Reception
The original ZX Spectrum release peaked at number 12 in the multiple formats chart in late 1983. The following year the BBC version reached the top of the BBC charts for one week.

The Telegraph named the game one of the "best video game platformers ever", deeming that it had been a "revelation" when released, though it noted that the game would appear dated to a modern player. Ollie Toms of Rock, Paper, Shotgun praised the games' portrayal of the antagonist caged duck, finding that the progression of the game allowed for the player to characterise her effectively. The A-Z of Atari 8-bit Games gave the game a score of 7/10, praising its graphics while criticising its sound effects, and finding that the game had a "certain charm".

The Spectrum version of the game was later rated number 13 in the Your Sinclair Official Top 100 Games of All Time. In 1996, GamesMaster ranked Chuckie Egg 86th on their "Top 100 Games of All Time."

Legacy 

Chuckie Egg was followed up, two years after its first release, with a sequel entitled Chuckie Egg 2. Available on a much smaller subset of platforms, this release changed genre quite radically and involved the player, as Harry again, working through a factory attempting to create Easter eggs complete with toy, in a Jet Set Willy-style adventure.  Whilst the first game had each level on one single screen, the new version had levels covering multiple screens.  Although the sequel has gained a small number of admirers, it never received the same attention as the original.

In 2017, a remake titled Super Chuckie Egg was released for mobile devices.

In October 2021, a VIC-20 port of Chuckie Egg was released by Reset64 magazine. This version requires a VIC-20 32k RAM expansion to work.

References

Further reading

External links 

Chuckie Egg for the Atari 8-bit family at Atari Mania
Chuckie Egg for the Atari ST at Atari Mania
Chuckie Egg at Lemon Amiga

1983 video games
Amiga games
Amstrad CPC games
Atari 8-bit family games
Atari ST games
BBC Micro and Acorn Electron games
Commodore 64 games
VIC-20 games
DOS games
Dragon 32 games
MSX games
Platform games
Tatung Einstein games
Video games about birds
Video games developed in the United Kingdom
ZX Spectrum games